Campbell McMurray (27 June 1893 – ?) was a Scottish professional footballer who played as a half-back or a full back in the Football League for Hull City and New Brighton, in non-League football for Workington and York City and in Scottish football for Vale of Leven, Strathclyde and Ashfield.

References

1893 births
Footballers from Glasgow
Date of death unknown
Scottish footballers
Association football defenders
Association football midfielders
Vale of Leven F.C. players
Strathclyde F.C. players
Ashfield F.C. players
Scottish Junior Football Association players
Hull City A.F.C. players
Workington A.F.C. players
York City F.C. players
New Brighton A.F.C. players
English Football League players
Midland Football League players